Stephen P. Grand is an American geologist, currently the Carleton Professor of Geophysics at University of Texas at Austin.

Education
Ph.D. in Geophysics, Caltech, April, 1986
BSc. in Physics, McGill University, 1978

References

Year of birth missing (living people)
Living people
University of Texas at Austin faculty
American geologists
McGill University Faculty of Science alumni
California Institute of Technology alumni